Magnus Gustaf "Gösta" Mittag-Leffler (16 March 1846 – 7 July 1927) was a Swedish mathematician. His mathematical contributions are connected chiefly with the theory of functions, which today is called complex analysis.

Biography
Mittag-Leffler was born in Stockholm, son of the school principal John Olof Leffler and Gustava Wilhelmina Mittag; he later added his mother's maiden name to his paternal surname. His sister was the writer Anne Charlotte Leffler. He matriculated at Uppsala University in 1865, completed his PhD in 1872 and became docent at the university the same year. He was also curator (chairman) of the Stockholms nation (1872–1873). He next traveled to Paris, Göttingen and Berlin, studying under Weierstrass in the latter place. During this period he edited a weekly newspaper, Ny Illustrerad Tidning, which was based in Stockholm. He then took up a position as professor of mathematics (as successor to Lorenz Lindelöf) at the University of Helsinki from 1877 to 1881 and then as the first professor of mathematics at the University College of Stockholm (the later Stockholm University); he was president of the college from 1891 to 1892 and retired from his chair in 1911. Mittag-Leffler went into business and became a successful businessman in his own right, but an economic collapse in Europe wiped out his fortune in 1922.

He was a member of the Royal Swedish Academy of Sciences (1883), the Finnish Society of Sciences and Letters (1878, later honorary member), the Royal Swedish Society of Sciences in Uppsala, the Royal Physiographic Society in Lund (1906) and about 30 foreign learned societies, including the Royal Society of London (1896) and Académie des sciences in Paris. He held honorary doctorates from the University of Oxford and several other universities.

Mittag-Leffler was a convinced advocate of women's rights and was instrumental in making Sofia Kovalevskaya a full professor of mathematics in Stockholm, as the first woman anywhere in the world to hold that position. As a member of the Nobel Prize Committee in 1903, he was responsible for inducing the committee to award the prize for Physics jointly to Marie and Pierre Curie, instead of just Pierre.

Mittag-Leffler founded the mathematical journal Acta Mathematica (1882), with the help of King Oscar's sponsorship, and partly paid for with the fortune of his wife Signe Lindfors, who came from a very wealthy Finnish family. He collected a large mathematical library in his villa in the Stockholm suburb of Djursholm. The house and its contents were donated to the Academy of Sciences as the Mittag-Leffler Institute.

See also 

 Mittag-Leffler distribution
 Mittag-Leffler function
 Mittag-Leffler polynomials
 Mittag-Leffler star
 Mittag-Leffler summation
 Mittag-Leffler theorem
 Mittag-Leffler condition of an inverse limit
 Mittag-Leffler Institute
 Mittag-Lefflerbreen (glacier)

Notes

External links 

 
 
 
 

1846 births
1927 deaths
20th-century Swedish mathematicians
Complex analysts
Academic staff of the University of Helsinki
Uppsala University alumni
Members of the French Academy of Sciences
Members of the Royal Swedish Academy of Sciences
19th-century Swedish mathematicians
Foreign Members of the Royal Society
Swedish magazine founders
Swedish newspaper editors